Antwerp Zoo is a zoo in the centre of Antwerp, Belgium, located next to the Antwerpen-Centraal railway station. It is the oldest animal park in the country, and one of the oldest in the world, established on 21 July 1843.

History 

Since its foundation, the park has been controlled by De Koninklijke Maatschappij voor Dierkunde van Antwerpen, a society originally called Société Royale de Zoologie d'Anvers (The Antwerp Royal Society for Zoology). This also became the popular nickname for the zoo, "De Zoologie".  The initial objective was to encourage zoological and botanical sciences. Its first director was renowned zoologist and botanist Jacques Kets (10 November 1785 – 1 February 1865). He accepted this position on one condition: a museum had to be built to house his nature-historical collections. This building was inaugurated in 1844 by H.M. King Leopold I. The predicate Royal was added to the name of the society on that occasion.

Throughout the years, it has encouraged wildlife preservation through activities and exhibits on a recreational, educational, scientific, and cultural level.

Notable buildings from that period are the Egyptian temple (1856) and the antelope building (1861) in Oriental style, which now houses the okapis.

The zoo has also a cultural function. Originally, concerts were held in the garden of the zoo. The museum building was demolished to build a concert hall. The hall then became the residence of the Antwerp Symphony Orchestra, the symphonic orchestra of Flanders. The museum collections were moved to the second floor.

For the 1920 Summer Olympics, the venue hosted the boxing and wrestling events.

After World War II, the animal park was turned into a model zoo which conformed to new and modern scientific, educational, cultural and aesthetic standards. The animal compounds were enlarged and admitted more light. Buildings from this period include the primate building (1958) and the big jubileum complex, established on the occasion of the 125-year anniversary together with the nocturama (1968), which houses the nocturnal animals. The jubileum complex houses birds of prey and the sea lions. In 1973 a new compound for reptilians was built, and in 1978 a new building for smaller species of monkeys. The older primate building was renovated in 1989. To support its educational mission, the zoo started with group tours and special educational programmes called zoo classes in 1969. Around the same time, planetarium exhibits were installed.

On 1 January 1983, the animal park was classified as a monument. Ten years later, its 150th anniversary was celebrated. In 1997, Vriesland (Freezeland) was opened. It houses subantarctic penguins and in the past also Alaskan sea otters. In spring 1999, the elephant compound was expanded. In 2003, many animals, including hippos, Malayan tapirs, and a number of swamp birds received a new home in Hippotopia.

Animals and exhibits 

Together with its sister park Planckendael, Antwerp Zoo houses over 7,000 animals of about 950 species.  Over 1.6 million people visit the zoo and Planckendael each year, and the zoo has around 200,000 supporting members.

Some exhibits and species in the park include:
 Vriesland with king penguins, macaroni penguins, and gentoo penguins. A couple of sea otters has also lived here, but they were replaced by seals after the last one died.
 Aquaforum with California sea lions, used to house bottlenose dolphins up to 1999.
 Reptile house, renovated in  2005 with many species of snakes, lizards, turtles, and frogs, as well as caimans
 The over a century old renovated aquarium, with renovations completed in 2015, housing many species of saltwater and freshwater fish
 Savannah aviary with African buffalos and several bird species including guineafowl, ibises and Abdim's storks
 Egyptian temple with Asian elephants, Hartmann's mountain zebras and giraffes,
 Aviaries and bird house with many birds species including military macaws, turacos, toucans, peafowls, pheasants and a large collection of Songbirds.
 Hippotopia with hippopotamus, malayan tapirs, dalmatian pelicans, Coypu and a couple of bird species
 Bearcanyon with spectacled bears, and coatis
 Cat enclosures with Amur leopard, lion and jaguar
 Flemish garden
 Kangaroo house with koalas and a tree-kangaroo
 Moorish temple with Okapis
 Monkey house with guereza, owl-faced monkey, javan lutung, emperor tamarin, black-headed spider monkey, golden-headed lion tamarin, pygmy marmoset, mandrill, Ring-tailed lemur and Black Lemur
 Ape house with chimpanzees, western lowland gorillas and the world's only eastern lowland gorilla in captivity outside of Africa.
 Birds of prey including snowy owl, spectacled owl, crested caracara, Kea and several vultures
 Other enclosures featuring harbour seal, bongo, meerkat, red panda, North American porcupine, American flamingo and African penguin

All the animals in the zoo and Planckendael combined consume about 41 tons of fish, 52 tons of meat, 37 tons of apples, 36 tons of carrots, 128 tons of hay, 4,000 litres of milk, 23,000 eggs, and 10,000 loaves of bread [in what period?].

The zoo used to have a dolphinarium called the Aquaforum. At the time of its building, one of the most modern of its kind. Over the years, however, the infrastructure was considered far too small and dated. The zoo's urban location prevented any expansion and meant the society could not build a new one. In 1999 the two dolphins were relocated to the Duisburg Zoo in Germany because of the new national standards for exhibits, with the exhibit too shallow to keep housing dolphins. The Aquaforum now hold sea lions, which are much less demanding.

List of animals of Zoo Antwerp

Architecture and garden 

Antwerp Zoo is one of the oldest zoos in the world, established in 1843. Many buildings are very well preserved. Some of them have received new functions throughout the years.

 Entrance of the zoo (1843)
 Egyptian temple (1856)
 Moor temple (1885): it still houses okapis. Antwerp Zoo became the world's first zoo with okapis in 1918.
 Bird building (1948)
 Nocturama (1968)
 Reptile building (1901): this building looks like a Greek temple.
 Aquarium (1910): designed by Emile Thielens.
 Winter garden (1897): a tropical greenhouse.

On January 1, 1983, the entire park (architecture and garden) was listed as a monument.

Breeding programmes 
Antwerp Zoo has played its role in preservation and breeding programmes for several endangered species, including  the okapi, the Przewalski horse, the Congo peafowl, the bonobo, the golden-headed lion tamarin, the European otter, and the Knysna seahorse. They take part in the European Endangered Species Programme.

Centre for Research and Conservation (CRC) 
The Centre for Research and Conservation is an important research department of the Royal Zoological Society of Antwerp. The CRC is not a separate research institute, but is very much embedded in the structure and functioning of the society. Research takes place at Antwerp Zoo, at the Wild Animal Park Planckendael, in other zoos and associated institutions, in situ in Cameroon with the Projet Grands Singes, in Brazil with BioBrasil, and in the RZSA's own wetland nature reserve "De Zegge" in Belgium. For all research fields, the CRC combines strictly zoo-related research and fundamental research, and reports to scientists in peer reviewed journals as well as to the general public. The conservation of wildlife and their natural habitat is very important for the CRC. The centre also receives money from the Flemish Government. In 2006 the Centre for Research and Conservation of Antwerp Zoo has won the EAZA Research Award.

Affiliated parks and domains 
 In 1952, the society in control of the zoo bought the nature preserve De Zegge in Geel, because nature preservation is an important part of its mission statement. It is an area that spans  and receives international wildlife protection.
 In 1956, the same society bought the Domein Planckendael in Muizen, near Mechelen.

Notes

External links 

  
Website of domain Planckendael (in Dutch and French)
Center for Research and Conservation

1843 establishments in Belgium
Venues of the 1920 Summer Olympics
Olympic boxing venues
Olympic wrestling venues
Zoos in Belgium
Buildings and structures in Antwerp
Tourist attractions in Antwerp